Vicia sylvatica (syn. Ervilia sylvatica), known as wood vetch, is a species of flowering plant in the bean family Fabaceae. It was described by Carl Linnaeus.

Description
This species is a herbaceous perennial with climbing stems. The leaves have 4 to 12 pairs of leaflets and end in branched tendrils. The flowers are 15 to 20 mm long arranged in racemes of up to 18 flowers. The petals are white with purple veins and the fruit is a pod or legume with 4 to 5 seeds.

Habitat
Found in woods, rocky ground and scree.

Distribution
This species has been recorded from  much of Ireland.

References

sylvat
Flora of Europe
Plants described in 1753
Taxa named by Carl Linnaeus